Turbina is a 1941 Czech drama film.  The name means "turbine" in several Slavic languages as well as in Albanian. It may also refer to:

Association football
FK Turbina Jablanica, a football club in Bosnia and Herzegovina
FC Turbina Naberezhnye Chelny, Russian football club
FK Turbina Vreoci, a Serbian football club
KF Turbina Cërrik, Albanian football club

Other
Turbina, Calamba, part of Calamba City in the Philippines
Fiat Turbina, a 1954 concept car
Turbina corymbosa, a species of morning glory plant native to Latin America
Nika Turbina (1974–2002), Ukrainian poet

See also
Turbinia, British steam-turbine powered ship